Joseph Burney Trapp CBE FBA FSA (16 July 1925 – 14 July 2005) was the director of the Warburg Institute and Professor of the History of the Classical Tradition at London University from 1976 to 1990.

Life
Trapp was born in Carterton, New Zealand, on 16 July 1925, and was educated at Dannevirke School. He graduated MA from Victoria University College in Wellington, New Zealand in 1947, and began his career as an academic at that institution in 1950, after a spell working at the Alexander Turnbull Library from 1946 to 1950.

In 1951 he emigrated to the United Kingdom, where he worked first at Reading University and from 1953 at the Warburg Institute, London University. At the Warburg he was assistant librarian (1953-1966) and librarian (1966-1976), before succeeding Ernst Gombrich as director (1976-1990).

Trapp married Elayne Falla, a fellow Victoria University alumni, in 1953 in England. He died in London on 14 July 2005, survived by Elayne, their two sons and five grandchildren.

Works
Trapp's first publication was a history of rugby in Victoria.

His most enduring work is his critical edition of The Apology of Sir Thomas More, published in 1979 as part of the Yale Edition of the Complete Works of St. Thomas More. He also published a volume of Essays in the Renaissance and Classical Tradition (1990) and Studies of Petrarch and His Influence (2003). With Lotte Hellinga he was co-editor of The Cambridge History of the Book in Britain, 1400-1557 (1999).

His work on John Colet and other English humanists, and his study of Petrarch, were published in the Journal of the Warburg and Courtauld Institutes over many years.

1990: Gray lectures at Cambridge
1991: Panizzi lectures at the British Library, Erasmus, Colet, and More
1994: Lyell Reader at Oxford

Awards and honours
Trapp became a Fellow of the Society of Antiquaries in 1978 and a Fellow of the British Academy in 1980. In 1990, on his retirement from the Directorship of the Warburg Institute he was presented with a Festschrift in his honour. In the same year he was appointed a CBE.

Further reading

References

1925 births
2005 deaths
Fellows of the Society of Antiquaries of London
Fellows of the British Academy
Commanders of the Order of the British Empire
New Zealand librarians
Academic staff of the Victoria University of Wellington
Directors of the Warburg Institute
Academics of the Warburg Institute
Literary historians
People from Carterton, New Zealand
New Zealand emigrants to the United Kingdom
20th-century New Zealand writers
20th-century English historians
English antiquarians